Hogtown is a multi-racial, multilingual "period-less" 2015 independent film. Set against the backdrop of the 1919 Chicago race riots, the story revolves around the mysterious disappearance of a millionaire theater owner during a snowstorm. Bill Stamets of the Chicago Sun-Times acknowledged Hogtown as "the most original film made in Chicago about Chicago to date". It was named one of the 10 Best Films of 2016 by Ben Kenigsberg, who reviewed the film for The New York Times, and JR Jones of The Chicago Reader named it the best film about Chicago and the best film made in Chicago, "period," for 2015.  The film won Best Picture awards at the 30th Black International Cinema Berlin, the 2015 International Black Film Festival (Nashville), the 2015 Los Angeles Black Film Festival, and the 2015 Independent Film Playoff (Los Angeles). It is the second of three films in an unnamed trilogy, following the 2010 film Chicago Heights and preceding Sister Carrie (2023).

Factual basis 
The era in which the story is set was when the infamous Chicago Race Riots of 1919 had the city in the throes of racial tension, and includes characters based on individuals involved in that crisis, including its first victim, Eugene Williams, and the first injured policeman, Dan Callahan.

Ambrose Greenaway, the theatre owner of the film, is modeled on Ambrose Small, who disappeared during a snowstorm in Toronto on December 2, 1919. The prime suspects in his disappearance are similarly modeled on real people - Theresa Greenaway on Theresa Small, and John Doughty, based on Small's accountant of the same name.

Ernest Hemingway, who lived in Toronto and in Oak Park (a suburb of Chicago) in this period, is also a character, as is the American author Sherwood Anderson, who was living and working in Chicago at that time.

In 1919 Chicago also faced the Black Sox Scandal, one of Major League Baseball's first, and biggest, cheating scandals.

Cast 

 Herman Wilkins as DeAndre Son Carter/Marquis Coleman
 Diandra Lyle as Nia Coleman
 Dianne Bischoff as Theresa Greenaway
 McKenzie Chinn as Aaliyah
 Alexander Sharon as Ernest Hemingway
 Nahum Zarco as Kakisamanetowayo
 Pete Giovagnoli as Dan Callahan
 Joe Mack as John Doughty
 Marco Garcia as Sherwood Anderson
 Gene Mui as Chiu Yuen Wong
 Sean Walton as James Cowan
 Jay Disney as Ambrose Greenaway
 Jose Ma Mendiola as Aparicio Reyes
 Etta Oben as Chicago Defender Reporter
 Patrick Cunningham as Jack Dempsey
 Teresa Cesario as Gloria Swanson
 Walt Sloan as William Hale Thompson
 Darren Stephens as  News on the March Narrator
 Jules Reid as Asylum Worker
 Steve Pavlik as Charlie Churchill
 Alex Kazhinsky as Coroner
 Kaelen Strouse as Doughty’s Cellmate
 Michael Wexler as Thomas Flynn
 Brandon Byrd as Eugene Williams
 Keisha Dyson as Madam
 Mary Mikva as Emma Goldman
 San Raysby as Sing Wing Racist
 Elizabeth Austin as Fortune Teller
 Emmanuel Isaac as Young Kakisamanetowayo
 Remoh Romeo as Young Marquis / Barber
 Marcelina Knade as Bookstore Patron
 Benny Stewart as Aaliyah’s Father / Devil-Horned Man II
 James Barbee as Evil Barber
 Rich Gratt / alleyway policeman & prisoner VI

Production 
Hogtown was filmed on location in Chicago and nearby cities; Crown Point, Indiana; Niagara Falls, Ontario, Canada; and Paris, France. A portion of the film’s micro-budget was courtesy of an Individual Artists Program Grant from the City of Chicago Department of Cultural Affairs & Special Events and the Illinois Arts Council.

Music 
Hogtown'''s orchestra score is performed by the College of William and Mary Wind Ensemble and conducted by Paul Bhasin, who composed the score.  The film also contains original gospel songs with music by Minister Raymond Dunlap and lyrics by Nearing.

Reviews
The Chicago Sun-Times wrote that Hogtown is "the most original film made in Chicago about Chicago to date".

Ben Kenigsberg of The New York Times included Hogtown in the 10th position on his list of the 10 Best Films of 2016, saying “Daniel Nearing has carved out an original and boldly unfashionable niche. Hogtown plays like a find from a forgotten archive.”The Chicago Reader named it the best film about Chicago and the best film made in Chicago, "period," for 2015.The Chicago Tribune commented that although "Some of the poetic conceits are a bit much; I'm not sure having actors grind through lengthy descriptive verbal passages while simulating lovemaking is really a viable idea," Hogtown'' "captures nooks and crannies and the underside of the elevated train tracks with a true artist's eye. There's a brief montage of gorgeously photogenic fire escapes, seen in all weather, scored beautifully by composer Paul Bhasin, that's better than the entirety of the last few features I've seen, period."

Awards and recognition
10 Best Films of 2016 - Ben Kenigsberg, The New York Times
Best Feature Film - 2015 Black International Film Festival
Best Film in a Fine Arts Discipline - 30th Black International Cinema Berlin
Best Film Made in Chicago, 2015 - The Chicago Reader
Best Picture - 2015 Los Angeles Black Film Festival
Best Picture - 2015 Independent Film Playoff - Los Angeles Big House Alliance at LA Live 
In Competition - 2015 International Festival of World Cinema Milan 
2015 Charlotte Black Film Festival
2015 Critical Edge Film Festival
2015 St. Louis Black Film Festival

References

External links 
 
 
 Staying Personal in Hogtown

American independent films
2015 films
Films about racism
Films set in 1919
Films set in Chicago
Films shot in Chicago
Films set in Paris
Films shot in Paris
Films set in Indiana
Films shot in Indiana
Films set in Ontario
Films shot in Ontario
Cultural depictions of Jack Dempsey
Cultural depictions of Ernest Hemingway
2010s English-language films
2010s American films